The 1899–1900 season was the 29th season of competitive football in England.

Events

Chesterfield and Middlesbrough replaced Blackpool and Darwen in the Football League.

Glossop debuted in the First Division, becoming the smallest town ever to compete in the highest English football division. The team finished in bottom place and was relegated, becoming the first of six clubs that so far have only completed one season in the top flight.

Honours

Notes = Number in parentheses is the times that club has won that honour. * indicates new record for competition

League tables

First Division

Second Division

National team
For the last round of international matches in the Victorian era, the England national football team played all three matches in the 1900 British Home Championship away from home.

Ireland
For the match against Ireland, played at Lansdowne Road, Dublin on 17 March 1900, the England team were confidently expecting an easy win after five successive victories, including winning 13–2 the previous year. The England selectors chose five debutantes, including four of the five forwards. Dan Cunliffe of Southern League Portsmouth, made his solitary England appearance at inside right, with his Portsmouth teammate Matt Reilly in goal for the Irish. Another Southern League player, Archie Turner of Southampton played the first of his two internationals at outside right, while on the left were Charlie Sagar of Bury and Fred Priest of Sheffield United, with the experienced Gilbert Smith in the centre. Priest's Sheffield United colleague, Harry Johnson played the first of his six internationals at Right-half.

In the event, the game was far more difficult than expected, with England only managing a 2–0 victory, with goals from debutantes Johnson and Sagar.

Wales
Nine days later, the England team travelled to Cardiff to compete against Wales with four new players. Arthur Chadwick of Southampton represented the Southern League, playing the first of his two internationals at centre half. The other three debutantes were up front, with Corinthians Geoffrey Plumpton Wilson and Tip Foster, lining up alongside their club captain, G. O. Smith, and Alf Spouncer of Nottingham Forest making his only England appearance on the left wing.

While the visitors were expected to win with ease, the Welsh "fought magnificently" to hold the English to a draw with Billy Meredith's 55th-minute strike cancelling out Wilson's third-minute goal.

Scotland
As Scotland had defeated both the Welsh and Irish by large scores, England needed a victory at Celtic Park if they were to retain the British Home Championship. They made only three changes from the side that had defeated the Welsh, bringing in Jack Plant of Bury to replace Alf Spouncer on the left, and recalling Ernest Needham (replacing Howard Spencer in defence) and Steve Bloomer in place of Tip Foster.

Scotland were "determined to succeed against the visitors" following defeats in the two previous meetings. In front of a world record crowd of 63,000, the Scots did not disappoint their supporters with Robert McColl
scoring a hat trick (his third for Scotland), with Bloomer scoring England's consolation. Scotland thus defeated all three of their competitors, enabling them to take the championship.

* England score given first

Key
 A = Home match
 BHC = British Home Championship

Notes

References